Friedrich Wilhelm Bernhard von Berg, also von Berg-Markienen, (20 November 1866 – 9 March 1939) was a German politician and chairman of the Secret Civil Cabinet of Kaiser Wilhelm II in 1918.

Biography
Friedrich von Berg was born on his family's estate of Markienen (today Markiny, Poland) to the Prussian Major Friedrich von Berg (1835-1888). After passing his Abitur, Berg joined the Prussian Army in 1885 and became the personal adjutant of Prince Friedrich Leopold of Prussia in 1888. He left service in 1892 and started to study law at the Universities of Breslau and Bonn, where he became a member of the Corps Borussia Bonn next to the later Kaiser Wilhelm II. After passing his exam, Berg worked at the local court of Bartenstein and in 1896 at Danzig. In 1899 he moved to Berlin, where he became an assessor. In 1903 he returned to East Prussia and worked as the head of the district administration (Landrat) of the Goldap district.

In 1906 he became a member of the Geheimes Zivilkabinett (Secret Civil Cabinet), the Kaiser's personal office. In 1909 he became the Landeshauptmann of East Prussia and in 1916 he was promoted to Oberpräsident of the Province of East Prussia. On 16 January 1918, Berg became the chairman of the Kaiser's office. He opposed peace negotiations to end World War I as supposed by Chancellor Max von Baden and had to resign on 11 October 1918.

He returned to his estate in East Prussia, where he was the President of the provincial diet (Provinziallandtag) in 1919 and the old-Prussian East Prussian Provincial Synod in 1920. The same year, he became the chairman of the German Nobility Association (Deutsche Adelsgenossenschaft) which he remained until 1932.

From 1921 to 1927 Berg was the Chief Representative of the House of Hohenzollern in their negotiations over the family's personal property with the Weimar German government (Cf. Expropriation of the Princes in the Weimar Republic).

Berg died in 1939 on his estate of Markienen.

References

1866 births
1939 deaths
People from Bartoszyce County
People from the Province of Prussia
German untitled nobility
Prussian politicians
Members of the Prussian House of Lords
University of Breslau alumni
University of Bonn alumni